In enzymology, an aryl-alcohol oxidase is an enzyme that catalyzes the chemical reaction

an aromatic primary alcohol + O2  an aromatic aldehyde + H2O2

Thus, the two substrates of this enzyme are aromatic primary alcohol and O2, whereas its two products are aromatic aldehyde and H2O2.

This enzyme belongs to the family of oxidoreductases, specifically those acting on the CH-OH group of donor with oxygen as acceptor.  The systematic name of this enzyme class is aryl-alcohol:oxygen oxidoreductase. Other names in common use include aryl alcohol oxidase, veratryl alcohol oxidase, and arom. alcohol oxidase.

Structural studies

References

 

EC 1.1.3
Enzymes of known structure